Marlon Santos may refer to:

Marlon dos Santos Prazeres (born 1995), Brazilian football forward
Marlon Santos da Silva Barbosa (born 1995), Brazilian football defender

See also
 Marlon